Happy Can Already! 2 is a Singapore dialect variety series which is telecast on Singapore's free-to-air channel, Mediacorp Channel 8. It stars Jack Neo, Mark Lee, Henry Thia, Wang Lei, Benjamin Tan & Jaspers Lai as the casts of the second installment. Happy Can Already! 2 aired from 19 May 2017 to 21 July 2017, every Friday from 11:30am to 12:30pm.

Plot
Liang Xi Mei (Jack Neo) and friends will reprise their characters from Comedy Nite, giving viewers an update on their lives since they last appeared on screen in 2003. Liang Xi Mei will be reacquainted with Lion King (Henry Thia) and Merlion King (Jaspers Lai), as they turn out to be her new neighbours. Her eldest son Robert (Mark Lee) is now married to Mary (Chua Lee Lian, but she will disappeared on this season) and they have a daughter Ah Girl (Toh Xin Hui). Her second son Albert (Benjamin Tan) is now in university.

Cast

Liang (Xi Mei) family

Lion King family

Other characters

Cameo appearance

Guest performers

Development

The first installment of Happy Can Already! attracted more than 200,000 viewers, with more than 80 percent of the elderly finding the show entertaining and informative. Many called for the show to be continued when it ended its run on 3 February 2017.

After the overwhelming response to the first season, MediaCorp and J Team, in collaboration with local director Jack Neo and the Ministry of Communications and Information decided to produce a second season.

Music

See also
Happy Can Already!
 List of variety and infotainment programmes broadcast by MediaCorp Channel 8

References

2017 Singaporean television series debuts
2017 Singaporean television series endings
Hokkien-language television shows
Channel 8 (Singapore) original programming